Christian Reineccius (22 January 1668 – 18 October 1752, aged 64) was an 18th-century Saxon theologian.

As rector of the gymnasium of Weissenfels, his writings served the study of Hebrew. He translated the Old and the New Testament into four languages (Leipzig, 1713–48).

Sources 
Marie-Nicolas Bouillet and Alexis Chassang (dir.), "Chrétien Reineccius" in Dictionnaire universel d’histoire et de géographie, (1878)

External links 
 Christian Reineccius on data.bnf.fr
 Reineccius, Christian on Deutsche Biographie
 Reineccius, Christian on biblical cyclopedia

German theologians
Christian Hebraists
1668 births
1752 deaths
People from Weißenfels